George Washington: An Initial Biography is a 1949 children's book, written and illustrated by Genevieve Foster, about the life of George Washington, the first President of the United States. Though written in simple language, the biography has been described as comprehensive and scrupulously authentic. The book was a Newbery Honor recipient in 1950.

References

1949 children's books
Children's history books
American children's books
Newbery Honor-winning works
Books about George Washington
Charles Scribner's Sons books